A Canterbury is a low, open topped stand with slatted partitions, and a drawer beneath, sometimes with short legs on casters, designed for holding sheet music, plates, and serveware, now often used as a magazine rack. Originally found in England during the 1780s, they were made in mahogany from about 1800, and later in rosewood and walnut. Later 19th-century versions were sometimes taller, and were made in brass or combinations of metal and wood.

According to Thomas Sheraton the reason for the name is that "A bishop of the see first gave orders for those pieces".

By the 1860s, the Canterbury was considered a status symbol within wealthier American homes.

References 

Furniture
Antiques